Damian Ramsey (1978-2007) was a musician, poet, composer and musicologist who invented the music genre word "synthpunk" in 1999 in order to retroactively describe synthesizer-based punk bands from 1977-1984. He documented this obscure and relatively neglected corner of American music history on synthpunk.org from 1999-2004.

He recorded and performed in the bands "Extent" and "I/O" and completed a solo CD called "Let Knowledge Serve the City" in 2004. An additional solo CD named "Plans" was finished in 2006.

Damian's signature dancing style can be seen in The Prids' music video "Let It Go" during the 2:58-3:09 portion, which proves treacherous for his 4-track deck.

As a computer scientist he had worked at Intel and at Cognex, a robotics company in Portland, Oregon.

Damian died of stomach cancer on April 23, 2007.  The legacy of his musicological archiving and documentation and the posthumous release of his music is being continued by friends, family, collaborators and fellow musicologists.

References

External links
 Damian Ramsey's Music - a blog about him by his parents, Ken and Lois Ramsey

1978 births
2007 deaths
American male poets
Deaths from stomach cancer
20th-century American poets
20th-century American musicians
20th-century American male writers
20th-century American musicologists
20th-century American male musicians